Enikő Sütő (born July 27, 1958 in Budapest) is a Hungarian model, mannequin, public personality. Her first photo was a half-hour made by János Fenyő in 1974, a poster for the  Fabulon, which based on the votes of the readers was chosen by Enikő Sütő in 1979 as the mannequin of the year.

References

1958 births
 Hungarian female models
Living people